Duangaksorn Chaidee (born 11 August 1997) is a Thai weightlifter, who competed in the +63 kg category and represented Thailand at international competitions.

As a junior, she won the gold medal at the 2014 Summer Youth Olympics.

In 2018, she was banned until 2020 by the International Weightlifting Federation after testing positive for 5a- androstane-3a, 17 bdiol (5aAdiol) and 5b-androstane-3a, 17 b-diol (5bAdiol).

She won the silver medal in the women's +87 kg event at the 2021 World Weightlifting Championships held in Tashkent, Uzbekistan.

Major results

References

External links

1997 births
Living people
Duangaksorn Chaidee
Weightlifters at the 2014 Summer Youth Olympics
Asian Games medalists in weightlifting
Weightlifters at the 2018 Asian Games
Medalists at the 2018 Asian Games
Duangaksorn Chaidee
World Weightlifting Championships medalists
Youth Olympic gold medalists for Thailand
Duangaksorn Chaidee
Duangaksorn Chaidee